The following is a list of programs formerly broadcast by American and Australian television channel, Speed.

Final programming

Sports programming

Racing series
 AMA GNCC Racing
 AMA Arenacross
 AMA Superbike
 AMA Supercross
American Le Mans Series
 ARCA Racing Series presented by Menards
 Championship Off Road Racing
 Continental Tire Sports Car Challenge
 FIM MotoGP World Championship
 FIM Superbike World Championship
 Formula D
 German Touring Car Championship (one-hour broadcasts during the winter months)
 GP2 Series
 IHRA
 IndyCar Series (Australia only)
 Lucas Oil Late Model Dirt Series
 Lucas Oil Off Road Racing Series
 Monster Jam
 MSA British Touring Car Championship (one-hour broadcasts during the winter months)
 NASCAR Camping World Truck Series (branded under NASCAR on Fox)
 NASCAR Nationwide Series (branded under NASCAR on Fox)
 NASCAR Sprint Cup Series (Budweiser Duel at Daytona & Sprint All-Star Race; branded under NASCAR on Fox)
 Porsche Racing Series
 Rolex Sports Car Series
 V8 Supercar Series (Australia) - shown Spring to Summer in the northern hemisphere
 Volkswagen Jetta TDI Cup
 World of Outlaws

Other events
 English Premier League Soccer
 Spanish La Liga Soccer

News and talk programming
 
 MotorWeek
 NASCAR Live!
 NASCAR Race Hub
 NASCAR RaceDay
 NASCAR Trackside
 NASCAR Victory Lane
 SPEED Center

Series programming

 The 10
 American Thunder
 American Trucker
 Barrett-Jackson: the Auctions
 Barrett-Jackson LIFE on the BLOCK
 Battle of the Supercars
 Car Crazy
 Car Science
 The Car Show
 Car Warriors
 Chop Cut Rebuild
 Dangerous Drives
 Drag Race High
 Dumbest Stuff On Wheels
 Ferrari Legends and Passions (Ferrari Leggenda E Passione)
 Intersections
 Jacked: Auto Theft Task Force
 KIT: An Autobody Experience
 Livin' the Low Life
 Lucas Oil on the Edge
 My Classic Car
 My Ride Rules
 NASCAR Performance

 NCWTS Setup (originally NCTS Setup)
 Pass Time
 Pimp My Ride
 Pinks!
 PINKS All Out
 PINKS All Outtakes
 Pumped!
 Ship Shape TV
 SPEED Test Drive
 SPEED Test Ride
 Stacey David's Gearz
 Stealth Rider
 SuperCars Exposed
 Truck Universe
 Two Guys Garage
 Ultimate Factories
 Unique Whips
 WindTunnel with Dave Despain
 Wrecked: Life in the Crash Lane

Specials
 24 Hours of Le Mans
 Barrett-Jackson Collector Car Auction
 Bathurst 1000 (live instead of highlights)
 Bristol Motor Speedway speed trials
 Budweiser Duel
 Budweiser Selection show (Drivers drew their starting spot for the Budweiser Shootout)
 Nascar Pennzoil Victory Challenge
 Nascar Pit Stop Challenge
 Knoxville Nationals
 Race of Champions
 Rolex Monterey Motorsports Reunion (select classes)
 Sahlen's Six Hours of The Glen
 SCCA National Championship Runoffs
 Sprint All-Star Race (2007–present; branded under NASCAR on Fox)
 The 10 Nascar Top 10 count down show
 The Day, an hour-long Nascar documentary that went over subjects such as the 2001 Daytona 500, the 1984 Firecracker 400, the 1992 Hooters 500, and the 2012 Daytona 500.
 The Roast of Kevin Harvick
 UNOH Battle at the Beach

Former programming

Sports programming

Racing series
 American Le Mans Series – transferred to ESPN and ABC; became United SportsCar Racing in 2014 and broadcast on Fox Sports 1
 American Speed Association
 Champ Car (2002–2006)
 European Touring Car Championship
 Formula One – given to NBC Sports
 IMSA GT Championship – SPEED showed its successor, the ALMS, until 2011 as well as the spinoff RSCS
 IndyCar Series (USA; IRL qualifying and the 1999 VisionAire 500K)
 REV-OIL Pro Cup Series
 Speed World Challenge (now on NBC Sports Network)
 Star Mazda Series
 Summer Shootout (during the winter months only)
 Toyota All-Star Showdown (cancelled in 2011)
 Trans-Am Series
 World Rally Championship
 World Series of Off-Road Racing
 World Touring Car Championship

Series programming

 101 Cars You Must Drive
 7 Days
 American Muscle Car
 Autoline Detroit
 AutoWeek on Speedvision/SPEED
 Back in the Day
 Barrett-Jackson Car Search
 Behind the Headlights
 Big Shots: Titans at the Tee
 Build or Bust
 Cars at Carlisle
 The Chase Is On
 Corbin's Ride On
 Darrell Waltrip Celebrity Blackjack
 Dream Car Garage
 Epic Ride
 Fast Track To Fame
 Fifth Gear
 Fine Tuned
 For the Love of Racing
 Formula 1 Debrief
 Formula 1 Decade
 Forza Motorsport Showdown
 Hot Import Nights
 I Wanna Date a Race Car Driver
 Indy 500: The Classics
 Inside Grand Prix
 Inside NBS
 Inside Nextel Cup
 Launch Hour
 Legends of Motorsport
 Lost Drive-In

 Men Behind the Wrenches
 Motorsports Mundial
 NASCAR Classics
 NASCAR in a Hurry
 NASCAR Nation
 NASCAR Past Champions
 NASCAR Smarts
 NBS 24/7
 NOPI Tunervision
 Overhaulin'
 Payback
 Pit Bull
 The Racing Chef
 The Reality of SPEED
 Redline TV
 Shooting Cars
 SPEED News
 SPEED Racer
 The SPEED Report
 Sports Car Revolution
 Street Tuner Challenge
 Texas Hardtails
 This Week in NASCAR
 Totally NASCAR
 Tuner Transformation
 Two Wheel Tuesday
 V-Twin Motorcycles TV
 Victory by Design
 The World's Greatest Auto Shows
 WRC Rally Magazine

Specials
 Rolex 24 at Daytona – Fox Sports aired the first 90 minutes of the Rolex 24 at Daytona (2007–2009)

References

 
Speed